Joshua Lloyd Ginnelly (born 24 March 1997) is an English professional footballer who plays as a midfielder for Scottish Premiership club Heart of Midlothian.

Primarily a left winger, Ginnelly began his career in the Aston Villa youth system before later joining Shrewsbury Town, Burnley, Walsall, and Heart of Midlothian. Only sporadically making first team appearances for his contracted club, Ginnelly has spent a number of years on loan at different clubs, including Altrincham, Lincoln City, Tranmere Rovers, and Bristol Rovers.

Club career

Shrewsbury Town
Born in Nuneaton, England, Ginnelly began his career at Aston Villa, where he spent seven years. Following his release from the Aston Villa youth system, Ginnelly began a two-year scholarship with Shrewsbury Town in 2013.

At the start of his Shrewsbury Town career, Ginnelly was immediately assigned to the club's youth team. He quickly impressed for the youth side, and subsequently was called up to the first team by manager Michael Jackson. Ginnelly appeared as an unused substitute in the last game of the season, in a 1–1 draw against Gillingham.

Ginnelly made his Football League debut under manager Micky Mellon on 30 August 2014, coming on as a late substitute for James Collins in a 2–0 win over Luton Town at the New Meadow. After the match, he said making his professional debut was a "dream come true". Local newspaper, Shropshire Star, praised Ginnelly's performance for his technical ability, quoting: "bringing down a long ball with his first touch before showing ambition by taking on two Luton defenders." However, Ginnelly only appeared two more times later in the 2014–15 season. He was awarded the club's Youth Player of the Year at the award ceremony.

He was offered his first professional contract in March 2015, but he failed to return to training the following pre-season with his contract situation unresolved.

Burnley
Ginnelly was reported to be having trials with Norwich City, and Burnley, and joined the latter for an undisclosed fee on a three-year deal on 10 August 2015.

Ginnelly was released by Burnley following the expiration of his contract after three years at the club, without making a first team appearance for the side.

Altrincham (loan)
On 8 January 2016, Ginnelly joined National League side Altrincham on an initial one-month loan. He made his debut on 23 January 2016 in a 5–0 win over Grimsby Town, playing the entire game. Ginnelly scored his first goal for the club three days later in a 3–1 win over Woking. He then scored two goals in two matches between 9 February 2016 and 13 February 2016 against Wrexham and Lincoln City respectively. During a match against Barrow on 12 March 2016, Ginnelly was the subject of racist abuse by opposition fans, prompting a police investigation. Despite this, he had his loan spell at the club extended until the end of the season, having previously extended the previous month. Ginnelly scored two more goals later in the season as he went on to make twenty appearances and scored five times in all competitions – Altrincham were however still relegated from the division.

Walsall (loan) 
On 28 July 2016, Ginnelly signed for Football League One side Walsall on loan until January 2017. He made his Walsall debut on 30 August 2016, a 72nd-minute substitute, in a 5–2 win over Grimsby Town in the Football League Trophy. He spent much of the start of the season on the bench, finally making his league debut on 15 October 2016 in a 3–2 victory over his former club Shrewsbury. His performance earned him a run of games for the club, however he returned to Burnley in January 2017 having failed to make an appearance since November.

Lincoln City (loan) 
On 30 January 2017, Ginnelly signed for National League leaders Lincoln City on loan until the end of the season. He made his Lincoln City debut, playing the whole game (and played a role that led to Terell Thomas scoring an own goal), in a 3–2 win over Woking on 11 February 2017. He made a total of seventeen appearances in all competitions as Lincoln finished as champions.

On 26 June 2017, Ginnelly re-joined Lincoln City on a season long loan for the 2017–18 season. Ginnelly scored his first goal for Lincoln on the first day of the following season in a 2–2 draw with Wycombe Wanderers on 5 August 2017. After suffering ankle injury that kept him out throughout August, he returned from injury on 9 September 2017, where he came on as a substitute, in a 2–1 win over Stevenage. It wasn't until 7 November 2017 when he scored again in a 2–1 win over Notts County in the Football League Trophy. A month later, on 26 December 2017, Ginnelly scored his third goal of the season, in a 3–0 win over Stevenage. However, he appeared in and out of the starting eleven, and faced competition from other players, including loanee signing Danny Rowe. As a result, he was recalled by Burnley, making nineteen total appearances and scoring three times in his second loan spell at Lincoln City.

Tranmere Rovers (loan) 
On 12 January 2018, he signed a loan deal with Tranmere Rovers until the end of the season. Ginnelly scored on his Tranmere Rovers debut eight days after joining the club, in a 3–2 win over Maidenhead United. Despite losing his first team place between late–March and mid–April, he returned to the starting lineup on 21 April 2018, in a 2–0 win over Halifax Town. In the play-off semi-final, Ginnelly scored in a 4–2 win over Ebbsfleet. Ginnelly played the entirety of the National League play-off final, helping the side beat Boreham Wood 2–1 at Wembley and ensuring the club's return to the EFL after a three-year absence. He went on to make 12 appearances and scoring two times for the side.

Walsall
After being released by Burnley at the end of the 2017–18 season, it was announced on 5 June 2018 that Ginnelly signed a one–year contract at former loan club Walsall. Upon joining the club, he revealed that Manager Dean Keates convinced him to re-join Walsall, citing his style of management.

Ginnelly's first game after re-signing for the club came in the opening game of the season, where he started the match and played 84 minutes, in a 2–1 win over Plymouth Argyle. It wasn't until 14 August 2018 when he scored his first goal for the club, in a 3–1 win over Tranmere Rovers in the first round of the League Cup. A week later, on 25 August 2018, Ginnelly scored again, in a 3–1 win over Rochdale. Ginnelly quickly became a first team regular, playing in an attacking role, and formed a partnership with Luke Leahy.

Preston North End

On 1 January 2019, he signed a two-and-a-half year contract with Preston North End for an undisclosed fee, keeping him at the club until the end of the 2020–21 season.

Bristol Rovers (loan)

Ginnelly joined League One club Bristol Rovers on a six-month loan deal on 16 January 2020.

Heart of Midlothian (loan)

On 2 September 2020, Ginnelly signed for then Scottish Championship club Heart of Midlothian on a season-long loan.

Heart of Midlothian 
In June 2021, Josh Ginnelly signed a two-year contract with newly-promoted Hearts after being released by previous club Preston.

Career statistics

Honours
Lincoln City
National League: 2016–17

Tranmere Rovers
National League Playoffs: 2017-18

Hearts
Scottish Championship: 2020–21
Scottish Cup: runner-up 2019–20

References

External links

1997 births
Living people
Footballers from Coventry
English footballers
Association football midfielders
Shrewsbury Town F.C. players
Burnley F.C. players
Altrincham F.C. players
Walsall F.C. players
Lincoln City F.C. players
Tranmere Rovers F.C. players
Preston North End F.C. players
Bristol Rovers F.C. players
English Football League players
National League (English football) players
Heart of Midlothian F.C. players
Scottish Professional Football League players